This is the results breakdown of the local elections held in Andalusia on 10 June 1987. The following tables show detailed results in the autonomous community's most populous municipalities, sorted alphabetically.

Overall

City control
The following table lists party control in the most populous municipalities, including provincial capitals (shown in bold). Gains for a party are displayed with the cell's background shaded in that party's colour.

Municipalities

Alcalá de Guadaíra
Population: 50,181

Algeciras
Population: 96,882

Almería
Population: 153,592

Antequera
Population: 40,732

Benalmádena
Population: 19,727

Cádiz
Population: 155,299

Chiclana de la Frontera
Population: 41,677

Córdoba
Population: 295,290

Dos Hermanas
Population: 66,819

Écija
Population: 35,161

El Ejido
Population: 36,335

El Puerto de Santa María
Population: 60,638

Fuengirola
Population: 34,008

Granada
Population: 256,073

Huelva
Population: 135,210

Jaén
Population: 102,933

Jerez de la Frontera
Population: 179,191

La Línea de la Concepción
Population: 58,779

Linares
Population: 57,401

Málaga
Population: 563,332

Marbella
Population: 74,807

Morón de la Frontera
Population: 28,439

Motril
Population: 44,482

Ronda
Population: 31,971

San Fernando
Population: 80,057

Sanlúcar de Barrameda
Population: 53,017

Seville

Population: 651,084

Utrera
Population: 40,736

Vélez-Málaga
Population: 50,438

References

Andalusia
1987